Petroglyph Games, Inc. is an American video game developer based in Las Vegas. It was founded in 2003 by Joe Bostic, Michael Legg and Steve Tall, programmers formerly of Westwood Studios, after that company was closed down earlier that year.

History 

Petroglyph was formed on April 1, 2003. On June 25, 2004, the company moved into their own building. On November 16, 2004, Petroglyph announced a project which they were working on, a new Star Wars real-time strategy (RTS) game called Star Wars: Empire at War, which was released on February 16, 2006. On September 12, 2005, it was announced that they would be working on an original military/sci-fi RTS franchise with Sega.

On January 27, 2007, Petroglyph announced their second game, Universe at War: Earth Assault. Universe at War was released on December 10, 2007. On April 15, 2008, Petroglyph announced that they would be working in partnership with True Games Interactive on a Free-to-Play microtransaction based online game for PC. On December 4, 2008, True Games Interactive/Petroglyph revealed their new game is called Mytheon, to be released in 2010. On April 27, 2009, it was announced that Petroglyph would be working on a massively multiplayer online real-time strategy game (MMORTS). On March 29, 2010, Petroglyph announced Guardians of Graxia. On April 26, 2010, Trion/Petroglyph revealed that their MMORTS is called End of Nations. On June 17, 2010, Trion/Petroglyph for their End of Nations MMORTS won multiple E3 2010 Awards for Best Booth, Best MMO, Best RTS, and others.

On February 22, 2011, Petroglyph announced their free-to-play multiplayer online battle arena game title, Rise of Immortals. On January 18, 2013 Petroglyph launched social guessing game Coin a Phrase on Apple's App Store. On March 5, 2013, Petroglyph announced the launch of its Kickstarter campaign for action-strategy game Victory.
On March 16, 2013, Petroglyph announced its cancellation of its Kickstarter campaign due to lack of interest. On March 13, 2014, Petroglyph announced its development of Grey Goo, a new RTS game, produced by Six Foot with publisher Grey Box. On October 16, 2017, Petroglyph and Team17 released teaser and announcement for Forged Battalion. On January 16, 2018, it was released into early access. On November 15, 2018, EA Studios has announced a partnership with Petroglyph Games and Lemon Sky Studios for the remastering of the Command & Conquer and Red Alert series. Many of the original developers of the game who established Petroglyph Games, including composer Frank Klepacki, were on board.

Games developed

References

External links 
 

2003 establishments in Nevada
American companies established in 2003
Companies based in Las Vegas
Video game companies established in 2003
Video game development companies
Westwood Studios